Andersson Island is a  long and  wide volcanic island of the James Ross Island Volcanic Group, located at the eastern end of the Tabarin Peninsula, Antarctica.

The island was originally named Uruguay Island by the Swedish Antarctic Expedition, 1901–04, under Otto Nordenskjöld, after the Argentine ship Uruguay which participated in the rescue of the ship-wrecked Swedish Antarctic Expedition in 1903. It was ultimately renamed Andersson Island on November 21, 1949. It was named for Dr. Johan Gunnar Andersson (1874-1960), a Swedish geologist who had served on the Swedish Antarctic Expedition. The renaming was necessary to avoid confusion with Uruguay Island, located off the Graham Coast.

See also 
 Cape Betbeder
 List of Antarctic and sub-Antarctic islands
 Yalour Sound

References

Islands of the Joinville Island group
Volcanic islands